Askhat Razdyquly Oralov (born 10 February 1990) is a Kazakh politician serving as the Executive Secretary of the Amanat party since 2 February 2022 to 4 January 2023.

Oralov served in various governments posts within and under ministries and has worked with the Amanat in leading positions in its branches in the capital Nur-Sultan. He also served as a deputy äkım of Pavlodar Region and Nur-Sultan and was its city councillor. Since January 2023, the Minister of Culture and Sports.

Biography

Early life and education 
Oralov was born in the city of Aksu in Pavlodar Region. He attended the universities of Moscow State Institute of International Relations and L. N. Gumilyov Eurasian National University in Astana where he earned his master's degree and PhD in international relations.

Career 
Oralov began his career in leading positions of the secretariat in the Nur Otan youth wing Jas Otan in February 2010 until April 2014. While serving the post, from December 2011 to September 2012 he worked as a chief specialist of the Department of Social and Educational Work in the L. N. Gumilyov Eurasian National University, before eventually becoming senior specialists of the Department of Organizational Work there.

In May 2014, Oralov became First Deputy Chaiman of the Nur branch under Nur Otan party in Astana until December 2016, where from there, he headed the Department for Youth Policy in the city. During that period, Oralov was elected as a youngest member from the 20th electoral district to the Astana City Mäslihat of the 5th convocation in March 2016, telling in an interview to Radio Free Europe/Radio Liberty: "My nomination to the mäslihat for me is actually a huge responsibility, a huge trust of our voters, the metropolitan leadership of the party's branch. For five years, I will try to justify these hopes." From there, he pledged to support youth initiatives and youth entrepreneurship, by setting "the gloss of the capital's youth".

On 3 January 2018, Oralov was appointed as the director of the Department of Youth Policy under the Ministry of Religious Affairs and Civil Society. He worked in the post before transferring to Pavlodar Region to serve as a deputy äkım for the region's social issues on 12 April 2019. On 13 July 2020, he returned to work in the central government as the Vice Minister of Information and Social Development. Oralov served the post for nearly a year before being appointed as the deputy äkım of Nur-Sultan on 12 July 2021, where he oversaw social areas. On January 4, 2023, was appointed Minister of Culture and Sports.

Executive Secretary of Amanat (2022–2023) 
On 2 February 2022, under party leader Kassym-Jomart Tokayev's decision, Oralov became the first Executive Secretary of Amanat, a new position formed after the post of First Deputy Chairman was disbanded. This came shortly after Tokayev headed the party and called for the post to be abolished and be replaced with Executive Secretary, resulting in previous officeholder Bauyrjan Baibek, a close circle of former President Nursultan Nazarbayev being dismissed.

Honours 
 Certificate of Merit of the President of the Republic of Kazakhstan (14 December 2018)
 Qazaqstan Konstitutsiasyna 25 jyl Anniversary Medal

References 

Living people
1990 births
People from Pavlodar Region
Kazakhstani politicians
Government ministers of Kazakhstan
Moscow State Institute of International Relations alumni
Nur Otan politicians